Girls' High School was a high school that was located in Roxbury, Boston. It was founded in 1852 by a group including Dr. LeBaron Russell. It was initially located above a public library in the former Adams schoolhouse on Mason Street.

In 1869, construction began for a purpose-built school building, located on Newton Street between Tremont and Shawmut Avenue. That building was designed for just under 1000 students, with 8 classrooms, 15 recitation rooms, 3 studios, chemical, physical, and botanical laboratories, and a hall, as well as facilities dedicated to the Girls' Latin School. This building was formally dedicated on April 19, 1871. By 1903, the high school's share of this space was described as insufficient in the Boston Globe.

The school became coeducational in the latter half of the 20th century. By spring 1974, the school housed 500 female students and 200 male students. That spring, the Boston School Committee voted to change the school's name to Roxbury High School. This name was the most popular among petitioning students.

Roxbury High closed in 1981

Notable alumnae
 Jennie Loitman Barron, attorney and judge (Class of 1907)
 Marcella Boveri, biologist and first woman to graduate from the Massachusetts Institute of Technology
 Melnea Cass, civil rights activist
 Wilhelmina Marguerita Crosson, educator
 Mildred Davenport, dancer and dance instructor
 Margaret Foley, labor activist, suffragist, and social worker
 Jessie G. Garnett, first African-American woman dentist in Boston
 Pauline Hopkins, novelist, journalist, playwright, historian, and editor
 Lillian A. Lewis, journalist
 Vera Mikol, journalist
 Ruth Roman, American actress
 Helen C. White, professor of English at University of Wisconsin–Madison (Class of 1913)

Heads of school
 Loring Lothrop, 1852-1856
 William Seavey, 1856-1868
 Ephraim Hunt, 1868-1872
 Samuel Eliot, 1872-1876
 Homer Sprague, 1876-1885
 John Tetlow, 1885-

References

High schools in Boston
Educational institutions established in 1852
Educational institutions disestablished in 1974
Public high schools in Massachusetts
1852 establishments in Massachusetts
1974 disestablishments in Massachusetts
Roxbury, Boston
Defunct schools in Massachusetts
Defunct girls' schools in the United States